HTLV-3 is:

 a former name for the human immunodeficiency virus (now known as HIV).
 now the name of a different virus, the  human T-lymphotrophic virus type 3